Parapercis shaoi is a fish species in the sandperch family, Pinguipedidae. It is found in Taiwan.

Etymology
The fish is named in honor of ichthyologist and marine ecologist Kwang-Tsao Shao (b. 1951), of the Biodiversity Research Center, Academia Sinica, Taiwan, who collected first type specimen from Taiwan in 1975.

References

Pinguipedidae
Taxa named by John Ernest Randall
Fish described in 2008